Sous le ciel de l'Ouest is a Lucky Luke comic by Morris. It is the fourth album in the series and was printed by Dupuis in 1952 and in English by Cinebook in 2015 as Under a Western Sky. It contains three short stories - Le Retour de Joe la Gachette ("The Return of Joe the Trigger"), Jours de round–up ("Round-up days"), and Le Grand combat ("The Great Fight").

Stories

Le Retour de Joe la Gachette

Synopsis 
Lucky Luke meets a man calling himself John the Philanthropist. When he arrives in town, he hears of a horse race with $5,000 prize money. He enrolls Jolly Jumper in it, but is robbed on the day of the race. In the race, John the Philanthropist somehow escapes his competitors, passing one after the other, but the rain falls and John's black horse is shown to be in reality Jolly Jumper painted black. On his faithful horse, Lucky Luke chases after John, who has meanwhile fled with the money from the race bets and catches him, having him shaved by the barber of the city, which reveals that it is in fact by Joe the Trigger, famous bandit. Finally, all is well which ends well.

Characters 

 Joe the Trigger: Calling himself "John the Philanthropist", he steals Jolly Jumper, paints him black, and uses him in the race.

Jours de round-up

Synopsis 
Arriving near a ranch, Lucky Luke hears about the round-up, a custom of cattle ranches where the best cowboys capture the oxen. But when an entire herd is captured, the owner of the "-3" brand ranch is missing 200 heads. Lucky Luke investigates and learn that two associated bandits have stolen these heads and changed the brands on them to "4B" to go unnoticed. But he stops them and the missing cattle are brought back to the ranch.

Le Grand combat

Synopsis 
A strong, illiterate man escapes the wrath of a bull and meets Lucky Luke. The latter then offers to put him in boxing combat against a formidable champion, known for "killing" his victims by beating them up, Killer Kelly. The challenger, called by Lucky Luke "Battling Belden", trains hard for the match, and the fight quickly becomes event-driven. Bets on Belden are increasing, so that a dishonest bookmaker, Slippery Nelson, wants to make Belden lose the match by kidnapping Rosita, his fiancée. Luke finds her and brings her back to the boxer who wins the match and the 10,000 dollar reward. As for Nelson, he ends up incarcerated.

Characters 

 Percival Belden: Strong boxer coached by Lucky Luke.
 Rosita: Fiancee of Belden.
 Slippery Nelson: Bookmaker for the fight between Belden and Killer Kelly, a dishonest man, he decides to kidnap Rosita so that Belden loses.
 Killer Kelly: Percival Belden's opponent.

References

 Morris publications in Spirou BDoubliées

External links
 Lucky Luke official site album index 

Comics by Morris (cartoonist)
Lucky Luke albums
1952 graphic novels
Works originally published in Spirou (magazine)